Colnic River may refer to the following rivers in Romania

 Colnic - tributary of the Bâsca Chiojdului River

See also 
 Colnic, a village in Argeș County, Romania